Fei Chang may refer to:
The Wade–Giles spelling of the name of Zhang Fei, an ancient Chinese general
Chang Fei, a Taiwanese singer and TV personality